Aaron Krickstein was the defending champion, but lost in the first round to Todd Witsken.

Stefan Edberg won the title by defeating Michael Chang 7–6(7–4), 2–6, 7–6(7–3) in the final.

Seeds

Draw

Finals

Top half

Bottom half

References

External links
 Official results archive (ATP)
 Official results archive (ITF)

Los Angeles Open (tennis)
1990 ATP Tour
Volvo Tennis Los Angeles
Volvo Tennis Los Angeles